Al-Damun (al-Dâmûn), was a Palestinian Arab village located  from the city of Acre that was depopulated during 1948 Arab-Israeli war. In 1945, the village had 1,310 inhabitants, most of whom were Muslim and the remainder Christians. Al-Damun bordered the al-Na'amin River (Belus River), which the village's inhabitants used as a source of irrigation and drinking water from installed wells.

History
Excavations at the site has shown pot sherds dating from the Late Bronze Age, up to and including Early Islamic, Crusader, Mamluk and Ottoman times. It might be the village Damun in lower Galilee, noted in Roman times.

Al-Damun is mentioned in early Arab and Persian sources since the 11th century CE. Local tradition identified the village as containing the tomb of the prophet Dhul-Kifl, who is mentioned in the Qur'an twice. Despite Islamic tradition claiming the tomb to be in al-Kifl near Najaf or Kifl Hares near Nablus, Nasir Khusraw believed it to be al-Damun when he visited the region in 1047. He writes "I reached a small cave, which is in Damun where I performed the ziyarat too, for it is said to be the tomb of Dhul-Kifl, peace be upon him."

Al-Damun was captured by the Crusaders, who referred to it as "Damar" or "Damor" during their invasion of Levant in 1099, and it remained in their hands unlike most of Palestine which was conquered by the Ayyubidss under Sultan Saladin in 1187. In 1253 John Aleman, Lord of Caesarea sold several villages, including al-Damun, to the Knights Hospitaller. It was mentioned as part of the Crusaders' domain in the hudna (truce agreement) between the Acre-based Crusaders and the Mamluks under Sultan al-Mansur Qalawun in 1283.

Ottoman Empire
Al-Damun, like the rest of Palestine, was incorporated into the Ottoman Empire in 1517, and in the census of 1596 the village was located in the Akka Nahiya (Subdistrict of Acre), part of the Safad Sanjak (District of Safed). The population consisted of 33 households and two bachelors, all Muslim. The inhabitants paid a fixed tax rate of 20%  on wheat, barley, fruit trees, cotton, goats and beehives, in addition to  "occasional revenues"; total revenue was  6,045 akçe.

Until the late 18th century the village was ruled by the Arab Zaydani clan, which rose to prominence in the Galilee through the campaigns of Sheikh Zahir al-Umar. They traced their lineage to the al-Zaydaniyya tribe which emigrated to Palestine from the Hejaz. The village mosque was built by a resident of al-Damun, Ali ibn Salih, who was also Zahir's uncle, in 1722–23. Inscriptions on the mosque entailed the genealogy of the Zaydani family and included a poem dedicated Ibn Salih.

In the late 1700, :it:Giovanni Mariti  noted that  around Al-Damun and Mi'ar were two "delightful valleys, ornamented with groves and wild shrubs. The peasants who live in the hamlets around, enjoy a most pleasant situation." A map by Pierre Jacotin  from Napoleon's invasion of 1799 showed the place, named as Damoun.

In 1875, al-Damun was prosperous and had roughly 800, mostly Muslim inhabitants and two mosques. In addition to the possible tomb of Dhul-Kifl, there was a shrine dedicated to a certain Sheikh Abdallah on an adjacent hill. An elementary school for boys was founded by the Ottomans in 1886.

A population list from about 1887 showed that Kh. ed Damun had about 725  inhabitants; all Muslims.

British Mandate 
At the time of the 1922 census of Palestine, al-Damun had a population of 727, of whom 687 were Muslims and 40 were Christians. All the Christians were Roman Catholic. The population increased in the 1931 census to 917; 870 Muslims and 47 Christians, living in a total of 183  houses.

At the beginning of the 20th century, al-Damun's houses were clustered along one road and starting in 1935, the residents started to build them with reinforced concrete.  The inhabitants drew their drinking water from nearby springs and irrigated some of their crops from the Na'amin River. They also engaged in allied activities, particularly plaiting mats and baskets from esparto grass. The chief crops of al-Damun were wheat, sorghum, barley, and olives, but it was also well known for its watermelons and cantaloupes.

In the 1945 statistics the population of al-Damun was 1,310; 1,240 Muslims and 70 Christians, The village's total land area was 20,357 dunams of land  according to an official land and population survey. 709 dunams were plantations and irrigable land, 17,052 used for cereals, while 111 dunams were built-up (urban) land.

Prior to the 1948 Arab-Israeli War, the Haganah kept files on all the Palestinian villages. The 1947 entry for al-Damun listed 25 individuals suspected of involvement with the Palestinian nationalist movement. In April 1948, Haganah reports say that the son of the main local land-owner, Sadiq Karaman, paid the local ALA garrison P£5000 to leave, presumably in an attempt to keep the village from getting involved with the hostilities in the 1948 Palestine war.

Israel 
After the initial Israeli successes in the central Galilee during the first stage of Operation Dekel, units of the Haganah's Sheva Brigade moved westward and captured al-Damun, among other Arab localities, in the second stage of the operation on July 15–16, 1948. However, Palestinian historian, Aref al-Aref, dates its capture earlier in May 1948, following the fall of Acre. Israeli historian Benny Morris reported that inhabitants were demoralized by the fall of Acre and then Nazareth, and so fled during the bombardment that preceded the attack on the village. The remaining residents were expelled and al-Damun itself was completely destroyed according to both historians.

Following the war the area was incorporated into the State of Israel. The village's land is now used for agriculture by residents of the Yas'ur kibbutz, which itself was built on the land of al-Birwa.

According to Palestinian historian, Walid Khalidi, in 1992, the site was "overgrown with thorns, cacti, olive trees, and pines. Stone and concrete rubble is scattered around it. The structure that formerly protected the central water source and regulated its flow stands untended and is collapsing in several places. The cemetery is extant, although the markers over a few graves are collapsing." British historian Andrew Petersen writes that the village had  a number of eighteenth or nineteenth-century stone houses, some which had decorated facades.

See also
Depopulated Palestinian locations in Israel

References

Bibliography

 

  
 
   
  

 

 
 

  

  

 

 
  p. 89

External links
Welcome to al-Damun, palestineremembered.com
al-Damun,  Zochrot
Survey of Western Palestine, Map 5:  IAA, Wikimedia commons 
Al-Damun, from the Khalil Sakakini Cultural Center
Al-Damun , Dr. Moslih Kanaaneh
Remembering al-Damun, Zochrot
, Saturday, 15.8.09, By Umar Ighbariyyeh, Zochrot

Arab villages depopulated during the 1948 Arab–Israeli War
District of Acre